Prabakaran a/l Kanadasan (born 30 May 1991) is a Malaysian professional footballer who plays as a left-back for Petaling Jaya City.

Honours
Felda United
 Malaysia Premier League: 2018

References

External links
 

1991 births
Living people
People from Selangor
Malaysian footballers
Malaysia international footballers
Malaysian people of Tamil descent
Malaysian sportspeople of Indian descent
Malaysia Super League players
Association football defenders
Sime Darby F.C. players
Perlis FA players
Felda United F.C. players
Selangor FA players
Petaling Jaya City FC players